Evelyn Cusack (born 3 November 1957) is Head of Forecasting at Met Éireann, having worked there since 1981 and also served as a well known RTÉ weather presenter since 1988.  She is former Secretary of the Irish Meteorological Society.

Personal life
Cusack was born in Clonaslee, County Laois, the middle child of a family of seven. She attended University College Dublin, earning a bachelor's degree in physics and mathematics (1979) and a master's degree in physics (1984).

Career
Cusack joined the Irish meteorological service Met Éireann in 1981.  She has also been a weather presenter on RTÉ since 1988. In 1999, Cusack and other well-known weather presenters such as Gerald Fleming, who were all professional meteorologists, were temporarily let go from their jobs at RTÉ in favour of younger, less qualified presenters. However, after protest from viewers, Cusack and her colleagues were swiftly rehired.

Cusack received the inaugural UCD Alumni award in science in 2014.

In March 2018, she became Head of Forecasting at Met Éireann.

Reality TV show
In 2008, she participated in RTÉ reality TV show Fáilte Towers. The show involved thirteen celebrities running a hotel for sixteen days and nights in order to win money for their designated charities. Cusack was the fifth to be eliminated.

Late Late Show
In 2016 Evelyn met young Johnny O'Loughlin on the Late Late Toy Show who had made a special weather board game for her.

References

1957 births
Living people
People from County Laois
RTÉ television presenters